George Foreman vs. José Roman was a professional boxing match contested on September 1, 1973, for the WBA, WBC and The Ring heavyweight championships.

Background
In his previous fight, George Foreman had dominated Joe Frazier, knocking the champion down six times in less than two rounds to become the new undisputed heavyweight champion on January 22, 1973. For his first defense, it was announced that Foreman would travel to Tokyo to take on little-known Puerto Rican challenger Jose "King" Roman. Prior to landing his title match against Foreman, Roman had little success at that point, fighting mostly unknown jorneyman, losing seven times and was not viewed as legit threat to take Foreman's titles. Roman would nevertheless make history as the fourth Hispanic and first Puerto Rican fighter to challenge for a major heavyweight title. The fight was also the first heavyweight title bout to take place in Japan and would remain the only one until Mike Tyson successfully defended his undisputed heavyweight title in the Tokyo Dome against Tony Tubbs in 1988.

The Fight
Foreman would make quick work of Roman, ending the fight after just two minutes and making it one of the shortest heavyweight title fights in history. A little over a minute into the fight, Foreman had Roman up against the ropes and landed several powerful punches that put Roman down. Roman was able to get back up and continue on, but Foreman quickly resumed his attack and caught Roman flush with a right hook that sent Roman crashing to the mat. Roman again answered the referee's count, but Foreman would quickly hit Roman with a right uppercut that put Roman down for the count. Foreman was named the winner by knockout at 2:00 of the first round.

Undercard
Ricardo Arredondo (Mexico) KO6 Morito Kashiwaba (Japan)
(Retains World Boxing Council world Junior Lightweight title)
Terry Hinke (United States) KO Richard Pittman (United States) Heavyweights
Takatsune Shimisu (Japan) WD Harbar Watanabe (Japan)
Kazuo Aikawa (Japan) WD Shikara Igarashi (Japan)
Hisami Numatya (Japan) WD Hiroshi ishibashi (Japan)

References

1973 in boxing
World Boxing Association heavyweight championship matches
World Boxing Council heavyweight championship matches
1973 in Asian sport
September 1973 sports events in Asia
Boxing in Japan
Boxing matches